"Ink and Incapability"  is the second episode of the BBC sitcom Blackadder the Third, the third series of Blackadder.

Plot

Dr. Samuel Johnson (Robbie Coltrane) seeks Prince George's patronage for his new book, A Dictionary of the English Language (which was actually published more than fifty years before the Regency period in which the series is set). The Prince  seeking to amend his reputation as an "utter turnip-head"  is interested, but Blackadder tries to turn him against the idea, condemning the dictionary as "the most pointless book since How to Learn French was translated into French". It soon emerges that Blackadder resents Johnson for apparently ignoring his novel Edmund: A Butler's Tale, which, under the pseudonym of Gertrude Perkins, he had secretly sent to Johnson in the hope that he would get it published.

Dr. Johnson has a meeting with the Prince, during which George fails to grasp the purpose of the dictionary because he thought Johnson's new book was a story about heroes, heroines and villains, while Blackadder annoys Johnson by continuously inventing and using new words to convince him that his work is incomplete. However, on learning that Dr. Johnson had also intended, if given the Prince's patronage, to promote Edmund: A Butler's Tale  a book Johnson considers to be "the only one better than his" (which Blackadder sarcastically assumed to be named Dictionary II: The Return of the Killer Dictionary)  Blackadder persuades George that he should, in fact, support the dictionary.

When Blackadder seeks to retrieve the dictionary for Johnson, Baldrick admits that he has used it to light a fire for the Prince; Blackadder resolves to find out where a copy is kept and have Baldrick steal it, threatening all manner of hellish tortures "involving a small pencil that could rival an eternity in Hell with Beelzebub in five minutes" if he does not comply. Repairing to "Mrs. Miggins' Literary Salon", where Johnson and his drunken, drug-addicted admirers Lord Byron (Steve Steen), Shelley (Lee Cornes) and Coleridge (Jim Sweeney) are socialising (though in reality, these people were not contemporaries, Johnson having died ten years before Shelley was born), Blackadder attempts to find out where a copy is kept, but Johnson indignantly proclaims that there is none, and when asked what he would do if the dictionary were to get lost, Johnson and his devotees smugly respond that they would simply kill the one responsible. Returning to the palace, Blackadder desperately attempts to recreate the dictionary before Johnson discovers the truth, despite knowing it to be impossible. Baldrick and George try to assist, but their efforts are of no help at all. Blackadder falls asleep having defined only two words.

The next morning, Johnson arrives and Blackadder attempts to cover up the mistake, but a surprisingly calm Johnson deems the dictionary "a waste of time" and orders Blackadder to throw it into the fire. Overjoyed, Blackadder embraces Johnson, but as his aunt appears and Baldrick transforms into an Alsatian; Blackadder realises that he is dreaming. The real next morning, Johnson and his devotees indeed arrive at the palace, angrily demanding the dictionary. Dr. Johnson explains that he has worked on the dictionary for "eighteen hours every day for the past ten years" with a rather bizarre description of his devotion:

Backed into a corner, Blackadder finally admits that the dictionary has been burned. Just as the enraged literati are about to kill Blackadder, the Prince emerges from his room, holding the dictionary and offering his patronage. Delighted, Johnson declares his intention to find Gertrude Perkins, at which point Blackadder admits that he himself is Gertrude Perkins and asks Baldrick to bring out the manuscript to prove it by giving the same signature as the one on the book, but everyone then realises that the book which Baldrick threw in the fire was in fact Blackadder's novel, which Johnson had brought with him along with the dictionary and accidentally left behind. Blackadder is, of course, devastated (comically excusing himself for a second to shout "OH GOD, NO!!!"). Johnson, however, departs in a fit of rage on realising that his dictionary is missing the word "sausage" after he reads Baldrick's "semi-autobiographical" novel ("Once upon a time there was a lovely little sausage called Baldrick, and it lived happily ever after."), as well as the word "aardvark".

As Blackadder laments the loss of his novel and chance at wealth, the Prince attempts to console him and orders Baldrick to light another fire. The episode ends with Baldrick obliviously throwing the dictionary into the fire.

External links
 
 "Ink and Incapability" BBC official Black Adder website. Retrieved 11 July 2008.
 

Blackadder episodes
1987 British television episodes
Television shows written by Ben Elton
Cultural depictions of Lord Byron
Cultural depictions of Percy Bysshe Shelley
Television shows written by Richard Curtis